Hide-Out is a 1934 American pre-Code comedy, crime, drama, romance film directed by W. S. Van Dyke and starring Robert Montgomery and Maureen O'Sullivan. It also features a young Mickey Rooney. The film was nominated for an Academy Award for Best Writing - Original Story (Mauri Grashin). It was re-made in 1941 as I'll Wait for You.

Plot
A womanizing racketeer (Montgomery) is wounded by police and hides out in a farmhouse, where he falls in love with a country girl (O'Sullivan) and meets her wholesome family.

Cast

Crew
David Townsend - Associate Art Director

References

External links
 
 

1934 films
American crime comedy-drama films
American black-and-white films
Metro-Goldwyn-Mayer films
Films directed by W. S. Van Dyke
1930s crime comedy-drama films
1930s romantic comedy-drama films
American romantic comedy-drama films
1934 comedy films
1934 drama films
1930s English-language films
1930s American films